Toda Mi Vida (All My Life) is the fifth studio album by American Tejano music singer Jay Perez. The album peaked at number eight on the US Billboard Regional Mexican Albums chart. The album received a nomination for Album of the Year (Group) at the 1999 Tejano Music Awards.

Track listing 
Credits adapted from the liner notes of Toda Mi Vida.

Charts

See also 

 1998 in Latin music
 Latin American music in the United States

References

Works cited 

1998 albums
Sony Discos albums
Spanish-language albums
Jay Perez albums